The Ausadie Building, at 845 First Ave. SE, in Cedar Rapids, Iowa is a historic building that is listed on the National Register of Historic Places (NRHP). It was designed by architect William J. Brown of Cedar Rapids. The design shows some Colonial Revival influence and interior features reflect some Bungalow/Craftsman styling.

It was listed on the NRHP in 2004. The listing includes a multiple dwelling, a secondary structure, and a garden.

The building was built by Loomis Bros. Construction, who also built the Consistory Building No. 2 at 616 A Ave. NE, in Cedar Rapids, another NRHP-listed building.

References

Residential buildings completed in 1923
Apartment buildings in Cedar Rapids, Iowa
National Register of Historic Places in Cedar Rapids, Iowa
Apartment buildings on the National Register of Historic Places in Iowa
Colonial Revival architecture in Iowa